Seehma (or Sihma) is a block and village of Narnaul tehsil in Mahendragarh district, Haryana, India.

Demographics
At the 2011 India census, Seehma village had a population of 4,664 (2,422 males (51.92%) and 2,242 females (48.07%)) in 895 households. It a literacy (3,308) rate of 70.92%, less than the national average of 74%: male literacy (1,978) was 59.79% and female literacy (1,330) was 40.2%. 11.23% of the population were under 6 years of age (524).

Nearby villages 
 Ajam Nagar
 Akbarpur Ramu
 Atali Atali
 Chhapra Salimpur
 Deroli Ahir
 Dongra Ahir
 Dongra Jat
 Dublana
 DULOTH JAT (metchu) 
 Faizabad
 Guwani
 Hudina
 Jat Guwana
 Kalwari
 Khampura
 Khaspur
 Khatripur
 Yogesh 
 Mittarpura
 Mundia Khera
 Meerpur
 Nuni Kalan
 Rampura
 Sagarpur
 Saharpur
 Saluni
 Sihma
 Silarpur
 Nidhi 
 Surani
 Seoramnathpura

References

Villages in Mahendragarh district